Soraya Peerbaye is a Canadian writer. She was a shortlisted nominee for the Gerald Lampert Award in 2010 for her poetry collection Poems for the Advisory Committee on Antarctic Names, and for the Griffin Poetry Prize in 2016 for Tell: poems for a girlhood.

She was born in London, Ontario to immigrant parents from Mauritius. She was educated at York University and the University of Guelph, and is currently based in Toronto.

References

Category1971 births

20th-century Canadian dramatists and playwrights
21st-century Canadian dramatists and playwrights
21st-century Canadian poets
Canadian women dramatists and playwrights
Canadian women poets
Canadian people of Mauritian descent
Canadian people of Indian descent
Writers from London, Ontario
Writers from Toronto
University of Guelph alumni
York University alumni
Living people
20th-century Canadian women writers
21st-century Canadian women writers
Franco-Ontarian people
Year of birth missing (living people)